The Egypt Renaissance Party is an Egyptian political party made up of former members of the National Democratic Party.

References

Political parties in Egypt
Political parties with year of establishment missing